The Taconic Mountains or Taconic Range are a range of the Appalachian Mountains, running along the eastern border of New York State and adjacent New England from northwest Connecticut to western Massachusetts, north to central western Vermont. A physiographic region of the larger New England province, the range includes notable summits, including its high point,  Mount Equinox in Vermont, and  Mount Greylock, the highest point in Massachusetts.

The Taconics contain several hundred miles of trails, including sections of the  Appalachian Trail, and over sixty designated areas of land protected by federal, state, county, and municipal, government agencies and non-profit organizations spanning their four state range.

Etymology
Taconic, a Native American name, was once transliterated as the Taghkanic or Taughannock, meaning "in the trees" and used as the name of a Lenape chieftain. Taghkanic is still used in parts of eastern New York, as in the name of Taghkanic, New York, a small town in the region, for both features within and outside the Taconic Mountains region.

Geography
The Taconic Mountains begin in northwest Connecticut and northeast Dutchess County, New York. The range extends through western Berkshire County, Massachusetts and the adjacent counties in New York, then along the border of New York and Vermont to the town of Brandon, after it loses prominence and dwindles into scattered hills and isolated peaks which continue north toward Burlington, Vermont. To the south, the mountains fade into the interior Hudson Highlands range in New York.

To the east, the Taconic Mountains fall off abruptly, ending in the valleys of the Housatonic River, the upper Hoosic River, and the greater Valley of Vermont. The Berkshires and the Green Mountains rise to the east of the Taconics. Near their northern terminus they approach the eastern foothills of the Adirondack Mountains in Washington County, New York.

In Massachusetts and Connecticut the geologically distinct  Taconic Mountains are often incorrectly grouped as part of the Berkshires, while in Vermont they are similarly mis-grouped as part of the Green Mountains.

Among the highest peaks of the Taconic Mountains are Mount Equinox , located in Manchester, Vermont, the range’s high point, Mount Greylock 3,491 feet (1,064m), the highest point in Massachusetts, and Mount Frissell , the highest point in Connecticut.

The Taconic Mountains lie within the New England-Acadian forests ecoregion.

Sub-ranges and regions
The South Taconic Range
Because the Taconic Mountains are geologically related and contiguous with the interior Hudson Highlands well east of the Hudson River Valley, the southern boundary of the Taconics is difficult to define. Bash Bish Falls, reputedly Massachusetts' highest waterfall, is located in the South Taconic Range. The Appalachian Trail traverses the eastern escarpment of the range; the  South Taconic Trail traverses the western escarpment.

Central Segment and Upper Hoosic River Valley Region
North of Catamount Ski Area, the higher hills shift slightly west and become somewhat less prominent. North of White Hill the Green River cuts through the range. Immediately beyond this, notable summits include Bald Mountain, and Harvey Mountain, part of the newly created Harvey Mountain State Forest (expanded in 2006  in New York and the site of extensive heath barrens; and Beebe Hill, with its abrupt, expansive views of the Hudson River valley from a summit firetower. 

The ridge contains an area designated The Stockbridge-Yokun Ridge Reserve by the U.S. Forest Service and thus eligible for certain conservation easements.

At Pittsfield, the crest shifts west once again to hills contained within Pittsfield State Forest:  Balance Rock Park and Bates Memorial State Park, where heights include Holy Mount , once the location of religious rituals practiced by a former Shaker community and Berry Hill , notable for its extensive stands of wild azalea.

North of Jiminy Peak , the valley of Kinderhook Creek cuts through the hills. Here the westernmost ridgeline is dominated by Misery Mountain and Berlin Mountain  and extending into Pownal, Vermont; the easternmost, which terminates in Williamstown, Massachusetts is ruled by Mount Greylock , the highest point in Massachusetts. Between these is the long ridge of  Brodie Mountain. The area hosts three long distance trails (the Appalachian Trail, the Taconic Crest Trail, and the Taconic Skyline Trail) and an extensive network of smaller trails.

Southern Vermont
North of the Massachusetts border, the profile of the Taconic Range is cut and eroded by the Hoosic River as it turns west and then south toward its confluence with the Hudson River, and by its tributary rivers in the vicinity of Bennington, Vermont. Mount Anthony , notable for its caves and as the location of Southern Vermont College, stands as a satellite peak above the surrounding eroded terrain. North of Bennington, the range gradually rises to its highest prominence with peaks such as Mount Equinox , the high point of the Taconic Mountains, and Dorset Mountain , a New England 100 Highest list summit. Other notable summits include Grass Mountain , a New England Fifty Finest list mountain; and Mount Aeolus , the location of several defunct marble quarries and the site of Aeolus Cave an important bat hibernaculum. Designated hiking trails are located on Mount Equinox, Dorset Mountain, and Mount Aeolus, and several other peaks within the region.

Northern terminus
Immediately north of Danby, Vermont, the Taconic Range broadens and becomes shorter for a time. The area around Lake Saint Catherine contains extensive slate quarries. The ridgeline to the east, composed of schist and phyllite, is dominated by the  escarpment of Tinmouth Mountain , overlooking the Valley of Vermont to the east in the town of Tinmouth. A field of less descript ridges and peaks lies between these two summits.

Near the end of the range, in the vicinity of Rutland, Vermont, the Taconic Mountains show several prominent peaks with dramatic, irregular cliff faces clearly visible from U.S. Route 4 west of the city of Rutland; these include Herrick Mountain ; Grandpa's Knob , the former site of the Smith–Putnam wind turbine, the first large-scale electricity-producing wind turbine; and the butte-like Bird Mountain (also called Birdseye Mountain) , home of the Bird Mountain Wildlife Management Area and notable as an important raptor migration path and nesting site. Also part of the Taconic Mountains are the foothills of the Lake Bomoseen region west of Birdseye and Grandpa's Knob, notable for their extensive slate quarrying operations. North of Grandpa's Knob, the Taconic Range soon diminishes into scattered hills which extend north into the Burlington, Vermont region. Isolated summits in this area include Snake Mountain , a Nature Conservancy preserve featuring a variety of rare and endangered species; and Mount Philo , home of Mount Philo State Park with its mountaintop campground.

Geology and physiography

The range is part of the Taconic Allochthon which arrived at its current location through low-angle thrusting from the east. This allochthon is generally older than strata lying beneath.  A dispute over the age of these rocks began in the 1830s and initially centered on conflicting theories of Ebenezer Emmons and  James Hall (paleontologist). By 1885, James Dwight Dana believed that Emmons' theory was correct.  E-An Zen proved the allochthon's existence in 1966 via a study of the region's faulting,  although it had been proposed in the early 20th century by Rudolf Ruedemann and Arthur Keith (geologist).   

The  Taconic mountain range was formed from the collision of the North American Plate into a volcanic island arc, similar to modern-day Taiwan, during the late Ordovician period, around 440 million years ago. Similar subsequent events built up the parallel mountain ranges to the east.

The western side of the Taconics rise gradually from a series of hills in eastern New York to a sharp mountain crest along the west border of the New England states; the east side of the Taconics falls off abruptly where river valleys divide it from the Berkshires and Green Mountains.

The Taconic Mountains are a physiographic section of the larger New England province, which in turn is part of the larger Appalachian physiographic division.

Natural resources extraction
Natural resource extraction has been an important industry in the Taconic Mountains; extraction industries have included marble, limestone, slate, and iron mining as well as logging and charcoaling.

Conservation
A narrow strip along the entire western border of Massachusetts has been designated by the U.S. Forest Service for potential conservation as the "Taconic Mountains Forest Legacy Area" under its Forest Legacy Program. The designated area averages perhaps a mile in width extending east of the state line, but is considerably wider in the southern Taconics region and middle section of Berkshire County. The district in Massachusetts abuts parts of New York State and Connecticut that carry similar designations under the federal program, which affords subsidies for the acquisition of conservation easements when available for purchase. The "Stockbridge-Yokun Ridge Reserve was designated as such at a slightly earlier date under the same federal program, which is aimed at close coordination with state and local government authorities. Multi-partner collaboratives that have targeted the Taconic Mountains include the New England Wildlands and Woodlands Collaborative, a regional conservation agenda for the New England states produced by representatives of dozens of non-profits and academic institutions and, more specifically, the Taconic Crest Project, which involves the states of New York, Massachusetts, and Vermont in collaboration with local land trusts and The Nature Conservancy.

See also

 Berkshires
 Mount Greylock
 Yokun Ridge

Further reading
The Rise and Fall of the Taconic Mountains  A Geological History of Eastern New York Donald W. Fisher Black Dome Press, 2006 

"The Taconic Controversy: What Forces Make a Range?," Appalachia: Vol. 73: No. 1, Article 5.

Available at: https://digitalcommons.dartmouth.edu/appalachia/vol73/iss1/5

References

 
Physiographic sections
Landforms of Litchfield County, Connecticut
Landforms of Bennington County, Vermont
Mountain ranges of Vermont
Mountain ranges of Connecticut
Mountain ranges of Massachusetts
Mountain ranges of New York (state)